The Bushati family was a prominent Ottoman Albanian family that ruled the Pashalik of Scutari from 1757 to 1831.

Origins 
They are descendants of the medieval Bushati tribe, a pastoralist  tribe (fis) in northern Albania and Montenegro. The name Bushat is compound of mbë fshat (above the village). This is a reference to them being pastoralists that weren't permanently settled. The Bushati started to settle permanently in the 15th century and this process had been completed in the late 16th century. Their settlement includes the village of Bushat in Shkodër in the Zadrima plain from where the Bushati family came. Another part settled with the tribe of Bukumiri in the would-be territory of the Piperi tribe, where they gradually became part of the new, larger tribe in the late 16th century. In the defter of 1497 they appear as katun Bushat in Piperi with 35 households.

The Bushati family traces their origin to the Begaj brotherhood of Bushati that had converted to Islam possibly in the early 17th century. To promote their status and political goals statesmen, commanders and leaders from that family put forward different theories about their origins. Evliya Çelebi in his time recorded a story about them being descendants of a Jusuf Bey Plaku, who traced his origin and status to the era of Mehmed the Conqueror. In the period of the Pashalik of Shkodra, Kara Mahmud Bushati sought to expand northwards in the old lands of Ivan Crnojević of the Middle Ages. In order to legitimize and strengthen his claim, he put forward another theory that he descended from Skenderbeg Crnojević, Ivan's Muslim son.

A century later, when the Albanian national movement was on the rise, yet another theory came forward. According to that theory, which Sami Frashëri recorded, the Bushati were descendants of the old feudal Dukagjini family.

History
Their dominance of the Scutari region was gained through a network of alliances with various highland tribes. Even after the fall of the pashaluk in 1831, the Bushatis continued to play an important role in Albanian society. During the 19th century, Shkodër was also known as a cultural centre and in the 1840s the Bushati Library was built.

Genealogical tree of the House of Bushati
  │Mehmed Paşa 
  ├─> Derviş Bey 
  └─> Ömer Bey
     │    
     └─> Süleyman Paşa (Vali of Rumelia, 1115 AH) 
         │
         ├─> Halil Paşa
         ├─> Ali Bey 
         ├─> Hasan Paşa                                     
         ├─> Arslan Paşa 
         ├─> Deli Hüseyin Paşa
         └─> Kapudan Mehmed Bey
             │
             ├─>  Abdullah Paşa
             └─>  Mustafa Bey 
                  │                 
                  ├─> Haci Süleyman Paşa 
                  └─> Mehmed Paşa Plaku (the Old)
                      │                 
                      ├─> İbrahim Paşa  
                      ├─> Ahmed Paşa 
                      ├─> Karamahmud Paşa
                      └─> Mustafa Paşa Qorri (the Blind)
                          │                 
                          └─> Mehmed Paşa (died in Tirana, in 1217 AH) 
                              │                 
                              └─> Şerif Mustafa Paşa 
                                  │                 
                                  ├─> Mahmud Paşa            
                                  ├─> İsuf Bey
                                  ├─> Hasan Paşa 
                                  └─> Riza Bey
                                      │                 
                                      └─> Celal Paşa

List of prominent family members
 Süleyman Bushati, sanjak-bey of Scutari, noted for his wars against Montenegrins.
 Kara Mahmud Bushati, chief of Albanian tribe based in Shkodër, named governor of Shkodër by the Ottoman authorities.
 Ibrahim Bushati
 Mustafa Pasha Bushati
 Xhelal Pasha, Ottoman official and related to sultan Abdul Hamid II through marriage
 Petrit Bushati, Senior Albanian Diplomat, Has served as Ambassador of Albania to Sweden, USA, Serbia & Montenegro
 Maliq Bushati, Prime Minister 
 Sali Bushati, former member of the Assembly of Albania
 Astrit Bushati, member of the Assembly of Albania
 Ahmet Bushati, Chairman of Municipality Council of Shkoder 1992-1996
 Xhemal Bushati, politician, former member of the Assembly of Albania, anti-Zogist activist
 Ditmir Bushati, politician and the former Minister of Foreign Affairs

See also 
For the village in Kosovo also sometimes called Bushati, see Komorane.

Sources

Pllumi, Zef. Frati i Pashallarëve Bushatli të Shkodrës:(Át Erasmo Balneo):(1756-1788); kronikë e gojdhanë. Botime Françeskane, 2004.
Stavri, N. Pashalleku i Shkodrës nën sundimin e Bushatllive në gjysmën e dytë të shekullit të XVIII, 1757–1796.(La Pachalik de Shkodër sous les Bushatli à la deuxieme moitié du XVIIIe siècle. Résumé.). 1964.

References

 
Families from the Ottoman Empire